Kilcroagh is a townland in County Tyrone, Northern Ireland, near Castlederg. It is situated in the historic barony of Omagh West and the civil parish of Urney and covers an area of 351 acres. 

The name derives from the Irish: Coill Chruaiche (wood of the round hill).

The population of the townland declined during the 19th century:

The townland contains one Scheduled Historic Monument: a standing stone: the White Stone (grid ref: H2554 8487) which stands over 1.5m high and is made almost entirely of quartz, hence the local name.

See also
List of townlands of County Tyrone
List of archaeological sites in County Tyrone

References

Townlands of County Tyrone
Archaeological sites in County Tyrone
Barony of Omagh West